Chinde District is a district of Zambezia Province in Mozambique. The principal town is Chinde.

Further reading
District profile (PDF)

 
Districts in Zambezia Province